Linton Township is one of twelve townships in Vigo County, Indiana, United States. As of the 2010 census, its population was 1,323 and it contained 555 housing units.

History
Linton Township High School and Community Building was listed on the National Register of Historic Places in 2002.

Geography

Unincorporated communities
 Pimento

Adjacent townships
 Honey Creek Township (north)
 Riley Township (northeast)
 Pierson Township (east)
 Jackson Township, Sullivan County (southeast)
 Curry Township, Sullivan County (south)
 Fairbanks Township, Sullivan County (southwest)
 Prairie Creek Township (west)
 Prairieton Township (northwest)

Cemeteries
The township contains three cemeteries: Kester Family Cemetery, Brown, and Union.

Airports and landing strips
 Kester Fly Inn Airport

Lakes
 Fowler Lake

School districts
 Vigo County School Corporation

Political districts
 Indiana's 8th congressional district
 State House District 46
 State Senate District 39

References
 United States Census Bureau 2007 TIGER/Line Shapefiles
 United States Board on Geographic Names (GNIS)
 IndianaMap

External links

Townships in Vigo County, Indiana
Terre Haute metropolitan area
Townships in Indiana